Castriidinychus is a genus of tortoise mites in the family Uropodidae. There is at least one described species in Castriidinychus, C. neocaledonicus.

References

Uropodidae
Articles created by Qbugbot